Horcajo de Santiago is a municipality in Cuenca, Castile-La Mancha, Spain. It has a population of 3,517.

Notable people
Lorenzo Hervás y Panduro (1735-1809)

References

External links

Municipalities in the Province of Cuenca